Clatterford End may refer to the following hamlets in Essex, England:

 Clatterford End, Fyfield, in the Epping Forest district
 Clatterford End, High Easter, in the Chelmsford and Uttlesford districts
 Clatterford End, Stanford Rivers, in the Epping Forest district